State Route 164 (SR 164) is a  route through Camden in Wilcox County in the west-central part of the state. The western terminus of the route is at its junction with SR 10/SR 41 Truck on the western outskirts of Camden. The eastern terminus of the route is at its junction with SR 28 in Camden.

Route description
State Route 164 is approximately three miles long.  It is aligned along the former route of State Route 10 as it approaches Camden from the west.  The route connects State Route 10, which bypasses Camden to the north, and State Route 221, a western bypass of the town, with Camden along a two-lane route.  The orientation of the route is east–west as it traverses its brief course.

Major intersections

References

164
Transportation in Wilcox County, Alabama